South Zone Culture Centre (SZCC). an autonomous organisation by Ministry of Culture (India) Ministry of culture at Tamil Nadu state is one of many regional cultural centres established by Indian Government to preserve and promote traditional cultural heritage in
India.Each zonal center also works to cross-promote and create exposure to other cultural zones of India by organizing functions and inviting artistes from other zones.  The current Chairman of the SZCC is the Governor (India) of Tamil Nadu, Banwarilal Purohit . The South zone cultural centre is one of seven
Cultural Zones in India defined and provided with administrative infrastructure by the Government of India.

Member states of the SZCC

Andhra pradesh,

Andaman and Nicobar islands,

Karnataka

Kerala,

Lakshadweep,

Pudhucherry,

Tamil Nadu,

Telangana.

Other Regional Cultural Centres of India
 East Zone Cultural Centre, Kolkata
 North Zone Cultural Centre, Patiala, Punjab
 West Zone Cultural Centre Udaipur, Rajasthan
 North East Zone Cultural Centre, Chümoukedima, Nagaland
South-Central Zone Cultural Centre, Nagpur, Maharashtra

References

External links
 Official Website of South Zone Cultural Centre

1986 establishments in Tamil Nadu
Cultural centres in India
Cultural organisations based in India
Thanjavur